Polonia 1 is one of the first Polish commercial television channels, consisting at first of a network of 12 (and - for a short time - even 13) local TV stations in bigger cities. The station was established by Sardinian businessman Nicola Grauso, who shared a connection with Silvio Berlusconi.

History 
Polonia 1 began broadcasting on air on March 7, 1993 by means of the following TV stations:
 PTV Morze (Szczecin)
 Tele-Top (Gdynia) (vel PTV Neptun)
 PTV Copernicus (Olsztyn)
 TVex (Bydgoszcz)
 TV-ES (Poznań)
 Tele 24 (Łódź)
 Nowa Telewizja Warszawa (Warszawa)
 PTV Echo (Wrocław) - the first one in the network
 PTV Opole (Opole) (vel Telopol)
 PTV Rondo (Katowice)
 PTV Krater (Kraków)
 Telewizja Niezależna (Lublin)
 TV Centrum (Kalisz) - 13th TV station, very short operational

The broadcast of common block in each of the station, received daily on VHS tapes, began each day at 16:15 and lasted till midnight. Time was filled with such productions like Japanese animated films, adventure and detective TV series (such as MacGyver, The A-Team), but first and foremost Argentinian soap operas such as Manuela, Maria, Stellina), but also movies and documentaries produced by the local communities. Remaining broadcast time was filled with either re-runs of Polonia 1, or stations' own productions. (local news, etc.). Exceptions happen from that general rule, while PTV Copernicus broadcast porn movies (in the morning hours).

Network gained huge popularity - becoming Poland's second most viewable TV station in 1994 being inferior only to Poland's national broadcaster TVP1; this number is, however, questioned by many experts. In the licence competition announced same year, Polonia 1 lost due to exceeding the permissible 33% foreign capital share in the company - all-Poland licence was then assigned to Polsat.

Also local broadcasting frequencies competitions were lost by Polonia 1, as National Council of Radio Broadcasting and Television (KRRiT) accused stations of the lack of independence from Italian investors.

Despite not receiving licences, Polonia 1 stations still broadcast, still trying to undermine concession decisions of KRRiT with Supreme Administrative Court of Poland (NSA) - with no effect.

August 29, 1994 was the day when prosecutor's office in Warsaw, Kraków, Opole, Lublin, Poznań oraz Szczecin (with the support of local anti-terrorist teams) conducted action of closing Polonia 1 stations, which broadcast on frequencies reserved solely for the usage of Polish military. Broadcasters were accused of direct life endangering.

After about 2 weeks following the closure, Polonia 1 started broadcasting via Eutelsat Satellite.

September 21, 1994 saw another wave of closing stations - this time in Gdynia, Łódź, Katowice and Olsztyn. Remaining stations in Bydgoszcz and Wrocław - after broadcasting for the next few months, willingly switched off their Transmitters.

Despite earlier announcements, Polonia 1 did not compete in the next licence competition. Nicola Grauso withdrew from Poland. Polonia 1 was sold to Polcast and now consists of lifestyle programming, teleshopping and pornography movies.

Between 1994 and 1997, Poland 1 distributed the Romanian channel on Saturday night TVR 2

References

External links 
 Official site of Polonia 1 
 Unofficial site of Polonii 1 fans
 Page with TV reminiscence articles

Television channels in Poland
Television channels and stations established in 1993